The following is a list of the avatars of the epic Mahabharata, and their original devatas (deities) or other beings.

References 

Mahabharata
Mahabharata